Aalto-1 is a Finnish research nanosatellite, created by students of Aalto University. Based on the CubeSat architecture, it was originally scheduled to be launched in 2013, it was launched on 23 June 2017. It is Finland's first student satellite project and indigenously-produced satellite. As of 2021, the satellite is operational.

Project history 
The Aalto-1 project began in 2010 with a feasibility study, which was conducted as part of a university course on space technology. The study was followed by the publication of a preliminary design in 2011. A critical design review (CDR) of the satellite was conducted in 2012. In all, over 80 students of Aalto University's School of Electrical Engineering were involved in the project.

Design 

Launch 
Originally the satellite was to be launched by a Falcon 9 launch vehicle, but the launcher suffered multiple delays due to the accidents that plagued the Falcon 9 in 2015 and 2016. The launch was removed from the Falcon 9, and Aalto-1 was launched on 23 June 2017 by PSLV-C38 launch vehicle from India.

References

External links 
 Official website (in Finnish and English)
 Launch website (in Finnish and English)

CubeSats
Space program of Finland
Spacecraft launched in 2017
Aalto University
2017 in Finland